The Homeopathic Institute and Hospital of San José (Spanish: Instituto Homeopático y Hospital de San José) is a Spanish homeopathic facility founded in the 19th century.  It is located in the Chamberí district of Madrid.

The hospital received patronage from the Spanish royal family including Isabella, Princess of Asturias.

Architecture
Its building, designed by José Segundo de Lema, was given a heritage listing, Bien de Interés Cultural in 1997.

References

External links

Buildings and structures in Trafalgar neighborhood, Madrid
Homeopathic hospitals
Hospitals in Spain
Bien de Interés Cultural landmarks in Madrid